El Farolito is an amateur soccer club based out of San Francisco, California. It currently plays in the National Premier Soccer League (NPSL), generally considered the fourth tier of U.S. Soccer, within the Golden Gate Conference. The team is best known for its 1993 U.S. Open Cup championship under its previous name, Club Deportivo (CD) Mexico.

History
The club was founded in 1985 and was first known as El Farolito, named after the owner's chain of restaurants. 'El Faro' was a new force in the San Francisco Soccer Football League (SFSFL) that was rising to challenge the dominance of teams like the Greek Americans. The team gained successive promotions to the top division in the space of five years. By the 1991–92 season, the club had won the SFSFL championship and had reached the final of the National Amateur Cup. The following season, El Faro retained the title as 'Club Deportivo Mexico'.

In 1993, San Francisco C.D. Mexico won the U.S. Open Cup, an American soccer competition open to all United States Soccer Federation (USSF) affiliated teams. The team pulled off wins against the defending tournament champion San Jose Oaks, Milwaukee Bavarian SC, before defeating United German Hungarians in the Final. As U.S. Open Cup champions, C.D. Mexico qualified for the 1994 CONCACAF Cup Winners Cup and played Club Necaxa of the Mexican First Division in the quarterfinals. They lost 5–1 in San Jose.

When the California Premier Soccer Association (CSPA) was formed in 1993, CD Mexico was one of the SFSFL representatives along with Greek-American A.C., SF United, and Concordia. The CPSA was developed as a 'super league' composed of teams from the SFSFL, Peninsula Soccer League, and the San Joaquin Valley Soccer League. The team, returning to their original name El Farolito, won multiple titles over the next two and a half decades.

On November 20, 2017, El Farolito announced it would field a team in the National Premier Soccer League for the 2018 season.

Year-by-year

Honors
San Francisco Soccer Football League
Division 1 Champions (11): 1991–92, 1992–93, 1995–96, 1999, 2001, 2003, 2007, 2009, 2012, 2015, 2017
Playoff Champions (6): 2007, 2009, 2012, 2013, 2015, 2017

National Premier Soccer League
Golden Gate Conference Champions: 2018

U.S. Open Cup
Champions (1) 1993
Participants (3): 1993, 2017, 2019

CONCACAF Cup Winners Cup
Participants (1): 1994

Notes

References

External links
Official Twitter
SFSFL Team Page

 
Soccer clubs in San Francisco
1985 establishments in California
U.S. clubs in CONCACAF Cup Winners' Cup
Farolito